Patricia Bay ("Pat Bay" to locals) is a body of salt water that extends east from Saanich Inlet and forms part of the shoreline of North Saanich, British Columbia. It lies due west of Victoria International Airport. A municipal park covers most of its eastern shore except at the southern end, which is home to a Canadian Coast Guard base, a seaplane port known as Victoria Airport Water Aerodrome, and two Canadian Government research facilities – the Institute of Ocean Sciences and GSC Pacific Sidney (formerly the Pacific Geoscience Centre).

History 
Patricia Bay was named after Princess Patricia of Connaught, daughter of the Duke of Connaught, Governor-General, who laid the cornerstone of the Connaught Wing (houses the Legislative Library) of the Parliament Buildings on 28 September 1912.

In the 1900s, there was a train track that connected  Sidney and Victoria. The Canadian National Railway controlled the track but later abandoned it in 1931. The track was moved south.

See also 
 Institute of Ocean Sciences 
 Victoria and Sidney Railway
 Victoria Airport Water Aerodrome
 Victoria International Airport

References

Bays of British Columbia
Saanich Peninsula
Southern Vancouver Island
Bodies of water of Vancouver Island